Jonathan David Blundy FRS (born 7 August 1961) is Royal Society Research Professor at the School of Earth Sciences at the University of Oxford and honorary professor at the University of Bristol.

Education
He is a graduate of University College, Oxford (B.A., 1983) and Trinity Hall, Cambridge, (PhD, 1989) and a former Kennedy Scholar at the Massachusetts Institute of Technology (1985). He was educated at St Paul's School, Brazil, Giggleswick School and Leeds Grammar School, where petrologists Keith Cox and Lawrence Wager also studied.

Career
Blundy is most noted for advancing the understanding of how magmas are generated in the Earth's crust and mantle and of the processes that occur in volcanoes before they erupt. He undertook his PhD research at the University of Cambridge under the supervision of Professor Robert Stephen John Sparks on the granites of Adamello-Presanella in the Italian Alps. In a series of papers with the notable Bernard Wood in the 1990s, Blundy popularized a theory of elastic strain originally developed by Onuma  to describe the uptake of trace elements into the crystal lattices of igneous minerals. The theory was based on high temperature and pressure experiments on molten rocks, and is now widely used to predict crystal-melt partition coefficients for use in modelling magmatic processes.

Blundy subsequently collaborated with Katharine Cashman at the University of Oregon on Mount St. Helens volcano in the Cascade Range of northwestern USA. Blundy and Cashman demonstrated the importance of degassing in driving the crystallisation of volatile-bearing magmas, a process that can occur without any attendant cooling. In fact, because of the release of latent heat of fusion, magmas that crystallise by decompression can actually get hotter in the process.

Awards and honours
Blundy is a recipient of the F.W. Clarke Medal of the Geochemical Society (1997), and Murchison Fund (1998) and the Bigsby Medal of the Geological Society of London (2005). He was a Fulbright Scholar at University of Oregon in 1998, Guest Professor at Nagoya University in 2007 and elected as a Fellow of the Royal Society (FRS) in 2008. His nomination reads: Blundy was also awarded the Royal Society Wolfson Research Merit Award in 2011.

References

External links 

 Profile on the website of the School of Earth Sciences

 Fellows Directory Royal Society Fellows Directory record

Fellows of the Royal Society
1961 births
Living people
Alumni of University College, Oxford
People educated at Giggleswick School
Petrologists
British geologists
Massachusetts Institute of Technology alumni
Fellows of University College, Oxford
Kennedy Scholarships